Ivan Ridanović was a Yugoslavian football coach active in Africa. He managed the Cameroon national team between 1976 and 1979, and won the Angolan Championship with Primeiro de Agosto in 1980.

References

Year of birth missing
Possibly living people
Yugoslav football managers
Serbian football managers
Cameroon national football team managers
C.D. Primeiro de Agosto managers
Yugoslav expatriate football managers
Yugoslav expatriate sportspeople in Cameroon
Expatriate football managers in Cameroon
Yugoslav expatriate sportspeople in Angola
Expatriate football managers in Angola